Carl Donald Peterson (February 2, 1918 – December 19, 1987) was an American jurist and politician.

Born in Minneapolis, Minnesota, Peterson received his bachelor's degree from University of Minnesota and his law degree from University of Illinois. He served in the United States Army Air Forces during World War II and as a judge advocate in the United States Air Force stationed in Japan during the Korea War. Peterson served in the Minnesota House of Representatives from 1959 to 1963 and was a Republican. Peterson served on the Minnesota Supreme Court for 19 years, from 1967 until 1987. Peterson died of cancer in Edina, Minnesota on December 19, 1987. His brother P. Kenneth Peterson also served in the Minnesota Legislature and as mayor of Minneapolis.

Notes

1918 births
1987 deaths
Politicians from Minneapolis
University of Illinois alumni
University of Minnesota alumni
United States Army Air Forces pilots
Republican Party members of the Minnesota House of Representatives
20th-century American judges
Lawyers from Minneapolis
Military personnel from Minneapolis
Deaths from cancer in Minnesota
20th-century American politicians
20th-century American lawyers
United States Army Air Forces personnel of World War II